F.N. Burt Company Factory "C", also known as Bison Storage, is a historic box factory building in Buffalo, Erie County, New York. It was built in 1911. It was listed on the National Register of Historic Places in 2017.

The building has seven-stories of reinforced concrete and is a daylight factory building.  It has a rectangular plan and is nine bays wide by two bays deep and has a flat roof.

The F.N. Burt Company occupied the building until 1932, after which the building housed a warehouse. Another factory operated by F.N. Burt in Buffalo was the F.N. Burt Company Factory. The building has been redeveloped as an apartment building known as The Crescendo Lofts.

References

External links
Buffalo Rising: Construction Watch: Crescendo on Niagara Street (June 2015)
Buffalo Rising: First Look: Crescendo on Niagara (March 2015)
Buffalo Rising: Mix of Uses Planned for Bison Storage Transformation (January 2015)
Buffalo Rising: Big Deal: 1502 Niagara Street Purchased (December 2014)

Industrial buildings and structures on the National Register of Historic Places in New York (state)
Industrial buildings completed in 1911
Buildings and structures in Buffalo, New York
National Register of Historic Places in Buffalo, New York